Vegas Creek was a census-designated place in Clark County, Nevada (southeast of Las Vegas) during the 1970 United States Census. The population recorded was 8,970. The census area dissolved and was added to the CDP area of  Sunrise Manor in 1980. The ZIP code serving the area is 89121.

Geography
Located at 36.129740 north and 115.074270 west, the census area of Vegas Creek was bounded by the census areas of Winchester and Paradise (Boulder Highway) to the west and East Las Vegas to the south.  The land area of the CDP was 5.4 square miles and had a housing unit count of 3,086.

Education
Clark County School District serves the area as well as all of Clark County.

References

External links
Historical images of Vegas Creek

Sunrise Manor, Nevada
Las Vegas Valley
Populated places in Clark County, Nevada
Former census-designated places in Nevada